Marie-Ève Juste is a Canadian film director from Quebec. Her 2012 short film With Jeff (Avec Jeff, à moto) premiered in the Director's Fortnight at the 2012 Cannes Film Festival, and was a shortlisted Prix Jutra nominee for Best Live Action Short Drama at the 15th Jutra Awards in 2013.

Her other short films include Summer Day (Canicule), The Sands (Plage de sable), A New Year (Le nouvel an) and As Spring Comes (Comme la neige au printemps).

References

External links

Canadian women film directors
Film directors from Quebec
Black Canadian filmmakers
Living people
Year of birth missing (living people)